MDS or M.D.S. may refer to:

Organizations
 Brazilian Ministry of Social Development
 Mennonite Disaster Service, a disaster relief volunteer group
 Movement for Socialist Democracy (Mouvement pour la Démocratie Socialiste), a former political party in Burkina Faso
 Movement of Socialist Democrats (Mouvement des Démocrates Socialistes), a political party in Tunisia

Companies
 MDS America, a telecommunications company
 MDS Inc., a healthcare company
 Microwave Data Systems, a wireless modem company
 Mohawk Data Sciences Corporation, a computer company

Science and technology
 Minimum detectable signal, a measure of sensitivity
 Molybdenum disulfide, a compound added to some plastics to make parts more slippery
 Multi-Displacement System, a Chrysler automobile technology

Computing
 .mds, a file extension associated with disk image descriptions
 MDS 2400, a computer
 Mandriva Directory Server, an LDAP server
 Microsoft SQL Server Master Data Services, a database management product
 mds, a daemon in macOS Spotlight
 Microarchitectural Data Sampling, a set of vulnerabilities in Intel processors
Minimum Data Set (MDS) used to define the smallest acceptable set of data items in a report or a message between two computer systems (interoperability)
 Cisco MDS, a line of Fibre Channel switches
 Master of Computer Science

Medicine
 Miller–Dieker syndrome, a neurological disorder
 Minimum Data Set, information collected for US Medicare/Medicaid asessement
 Myelodysplastic syndrome

Mathematics
 Martingale difference sequence, in probability theory
 Maximum distance separable code, in mathematical coding theory
 Multidimensional scaling, a statistical technique

Transport
 Meridian Southern Railway, in Mississippi, US
 Middle Caicos Airport, IATA code
 Morden South railway station, London, National Rail station code

Other uses
 MDs (TV series), a 2002 American medical drama
 Marathon des Sables, an ultramarathon held in Morocco
 Master of Dental Surgery
 Mission Design Series, a United States Department of Defense aerospace vehicle designation
 Miriam Defensor Santiago (1945-2016), former senator of the Philippines